Hooghoudt is a Gronings producer of several alcoholic beverages. The company was founded in 1888. Hooghoudt's products include genever (a gin-like liquor), vodka and beerenburg.

History

The family company was founded in 1888 by Hero Jan Hooghoudt, who had been a baker. The distillery was based in the city centre of Groningen, but has since moved to a new complex in an office park in Euvelgunne. The distillery employs between 50–100 people and has an estimated revenue of 10 to 25 million euros. The distillery has a relationship with the Herberg Hooghoudt tasting room and café on Reguliersgracht ("regulator's canal") in Amsterdam.

References

External links
 Hooghoudt Distillers English website (requires age verification)

Companies based in Groningen (province)
Dutch distilled drinks
Groningen (city)